

L

The DST column shows the months in which Daylight Saving Time, a.k.a. Summer Time, begins and ends. A blank DST box usually indicates that the location stays on Standard Time all year, although in some cases the location stays on Summer Time all year. If a location is currently on DST, add one hour to the time in the Time column.

Notes
  Clocks on Lord Howe Island are advanced only 30 minutes for Daylight Saving Time.
  Airport is located in Saxony.
  LON is common IATA code for Heathrow Airport , Gatwick Airport , Luton Airport , London Stansted Airport , London City Airport , London Southend Airport  and London Biggin Hill Airport .

References

  - includes IATA codes
 
 Aviation Safety Network - IATA and ICAO airport codes
 Great Circle Mapper - IATA, ICAO and FAA airport codes

L